Anne Andersen  may refer to:
Anne Nymark Andersen (born 1972), Norwegian footballer
Anne Berit Andersen (born 1951), Norwegian politician
Anne Dsane Andersen (born 1992), Danish rower

See also
Anne Anderson (disambiguation)